Tridecylic acid, or tridecanoic acid, is the organic compound with the formula .  It is a 13-carbon saturated fatty acid.  It is a white solid.

A laboratory preparation involves permanganate oxidation of 1-tetradecene.

See also
List of saturated fatty acids

References

Fatty acids
Alkanoic acids